Halochromatium roseum is a Gram-negative, rod-shaped, phototrophic and non-motile bacterium from the genus of Halochromatium which has been isolated from a marine solar saltern from Kakinada in India.

References 

Chromatiales
Bacteria described in 2007